Brinda Parekh is an Indian actress and model. She has acted in South Indian films and has also done item numbers in Tamil, Telugu, Kannada and Hindi films. She has acted in 4 movies in Tamil, several other movies in Telugu and Kannada and 3 Hindi movies.

Career 
Being born and brought up in Mumbai, she started her career from modeling in television commercials like Vimal Suitings, Microsoft Windows XP, Anchor Switches, VIP Frenchie, Kit Kat, Thumbs Up, Polo Mint, Royal Challenge Beer, Amul Macho Vests, etc., and hundreds of other brands in print media as well. Before entering films she appeared in music videos.

Filmography

 Music videos
Gandasiyaan - Sarbjit Cheema
Vaada Tera Vaada - Nitin Bali
Tera Hasna Kamaal - Shael Oswal
Jogiya - Romey Gill
Yeh Mera Dil Pyar Ka Deewana
Kar Le Kar Le Koi Dhamaal (Kaun Banega Crorepati Theme Song)

 Television
Tumhari Disha
Kaisa Ye Pyar Hai

References

External links

Official website

Living people
21st-century Indian actresses
Actresses in Tamil cinema
Female models from Mumbai
Actresses in Kannada cinema
Actresses from Mumbai
1981 births
Indian film actresses
Actresses in Marathi cinema
Actresses in Telugu cinema